The Postal River is a river of the West Coast Region of New Zealand's South Island. It flows west from the Fenian Range, reaching the Oparara River five kilometres northeast of Karamea. The Postal River's entire length is within Kahurangi National Park.

See also
List of rivers of New Zealand

References

Rivers of the West Coast, New Zealand
Buller District
Kahurangi National Park
Rivers of New Zealand